Neritina pulligera, common name the dusky nerite, is a species of freshwater snail, a gastropod mollusk in the family Neritidae.

Neritina pulligera is the type species of the genus Neritina.

Subspecies 
There are two subspecies:
 Neritina pulligera knorii
 Neritina pulligera stumpfi

Description
The length of the shell 23 mm.

Distribution
Distribution includes:
 Australia (Northern Territory, Queensland)
 lands in Pacific Ocean: Comoros, Fiji, Guam, New Caledonia, Palau, Papua New Guinea, Federated States of Micronesia, Solomon Islands (Santa Cruz Is., South Solomons), Vanuatu
 South-East Asia:
 Indonesia (Bali, Irian Jaya, Jawa, Kalimantan, Lesser Sunda Is., Maluku, Sulawesi, Sumatera)
 Malaysia
 Thailand
 Philippines
 India (Andaman Islands, Nicobar Islands)
 lands in Indian Ocean: Mauritius (Mauritius main island, Rodrigues), Réunion, Seychelles
 Africa: Kenya, Tanzania, South Africa (Eastern Cape Province, KwaZulu-Natal), Mozambique, Madagascar
 and in the Pacific Ocean along Okinawa.

It is a Near Threatened species in Africa.

The type locality is "in Indiæ fluviis".

Ecology
Neritina pulligera lives in fast-flowing freshwater streams and in rivers. It is found on rocky substrates.

Population density of Neritina pulligera is 2-7 snails per m2 in Caroline Islands.

References

Further reading 
 Dautzenberg Ph. (1929). Mollusques testacés marins de Madagascar. Faune des Colonies Francaises, Tome III.
 Fischer-Piette, E. & Vukadinovic, D. (1973). Sur les Mollusques Fluviatiles de Madagascar. Malacologia. 12: 339-378
 Fischer-Piette, E. & Vukadinovic, D. (1974). Les Mollusques terrestres des Iles Comores. Mémoires du Museum National d'Histoire Naturelle, Nouvelle Série, Série A, Zoologie, 84: 1-76, 1 plate. Paris.
 Haynes A. (2005). "An evaluation of members of the genera Clithon Montfort, 1810 and Neritina Lamarck 1816 (Gastropoda: Neritidae)". Molluscan Research 25(2): 75–84.
 Abdou, A.; Galzin, R.; Lord, C.; Denis, G. P. J. & Keith, P. (2017). Revision of the species complex 'Neritina pulligera' (Gastropoda, Cycloneritimorpha: Neritidae) using taxonomy and barcoding. Vie et Milieu. 67 (3-4): 149-161

External links
  Linnaeus, C. (1767). Systema naturae per regna tria naturae: secundum classes, ordines, genera, species, cum characteribus, differentiis, synonymis, locis. Ed. 12. 1., Regnum Animale. 1 & 2. Holmiae
  Récluz, C. A. (1841). Description de quelques nouvelles espèces de Nérites vivantes. Revue Zoologique, par la Société Cuvierienne. 1841
 Philippi, (R.) A. (1845). Diagnosen einiger neuen Conchylien. Archiv für Naturgeschichte. 11: 50-71
 Sowerby, G. B., II. (1849). Monograph of the genus Neritina. In G. B. Sowerby II (ed.), Thesaurus conchyliorum, or monographs of genera of shells. Vol. 2 (10): 507-546, pls. 109–116. London, privately published
 

Neritidae
Gastropods described in 1767
Taxa named by Carl Linnaeus